Ian Smeulers (born 12 January 2000) is a Dutch professional footballer who plays as a left-back.

Career
Smeulders began playing football at the youth academy of Feyenoord in 2006. He began his senior career on loan with Dordrecht for the 2019–20 season. Smeulders made his professional debut with Dordrecht in a 1–1 Eerste Divisie tie with Roda on 15 November 2019. He was loaned to Willem II in the Eredivisie on 1 February 2021.

References

External links
 
 Ons Oranje O17 Profile
 Ons Oranje O18 Profile
 Ons Oranje O19 Profile

2000 births
Living people
Footballers from Barendrecht
Dutch footballers
Netherlands youth international footballers
Association football fullbacks
Feyenoord players
FC Dordrecht players
Willem II (football club) players
Eredivisie players
Eerste Divisie players